Lorig Charkoudian (born February 14, 1973) is an American politician. She is a Democrat representing District 20 in the Maryland House of Delegates.

Personal life 

Charkoudian was born in Boston, Massachusetts. She holds a Bachelor's degree in Mathematical Economics from Pomona College and a PhD in Economics from Johns Hopkins University.

Political career 

In 2018, Charkoudian ran for election to one of three seats representing District 20 in the Maryland House of Delegates. Along with incumbents David Moon and Jheanelle Wilkins, she won a seven-way Democratic primary; the three of them were the only candidates on the ballot in the general election.

As of June 2020, Charkoudian sits on the Economic Matters committee, and the Public Utilities and Unemployment Insurance subcommittees.

Electoral record

References 

Living people
Democratic Party members of the Maryland House of Delegates
Politicians from Boston
Johns Hopkins University alumni
Pomona College alumni
People from Takoma Park, Maryland
Women state legislators in Maryland
1973 births
21st-century American politicians
21st-century American women politicians